Samuel Gilbert Hathaway (July 18, 1780 – May 2, 1867) was an American politician who served one term as a U.S. Representative from New York from 1833 to 1835.

Biography
Born in Freetown, Massachusetts, Hathaway attended the public schools.
He worked at various occupations and made one sea voyage.
He moved to Chenango County, New York, in 1803 and two years later to Cincinnatus, Cortland County, and engaged in agricultural pursuits.

Career 
He was in the Justice of the Peace 1810–1858.
He served as member of the State assembly in 1814 and 1818.
He moved to Solon, New York, in 1819.
He served in the State senate in 1823.
Major general in the New York Militia 1823–1858.

Congress 
Hathaway was elected as a Jacksonian to the Twenty-third Congress (March 4, 1833 – March 3, 1835).

Later career and death 
He served as presidential elector on the Democratic ticket in 1852.
He served as delegate to the Democratic National Convention at Charleston, South Carolina, in 1860.

He died in Solon, New York, May 2, 1867.
He was interred in the family cemetery near Solon.

Legacy 
His home at Solon, known as the Hatheway Homestead, was listed on the National Register of Historic Places in 1978.

References

1780 births
1867 deaths
People from Freetown, Massachusetts
American militia generals
Jacksonian members of the United States House of Representatives from New York (state)
1852 United States presidential electors
People from Cincinnatus, New York
19th-century American politicians
Democratic Party members of the United States House of Representatives from New York (state)